A total solar eclipse will occur on January 16, 2094. A solar eclipse occurs when the Moon passes between Earth and the Sun, thereby totally or partly obscuring the image of the Sun for a viewer on Earth. A total solar eclipse occurs when the Moon's apparent diameter is larger than the Sun's, blocking all direct sunlight, turning day into darkness. Totality occurs in a narrow path across Earth's surface, with the partial solar eclipse visible over a surrounding region thousands of kilometres wide.

This total eclipse is notable in that the path of totality passes over the South Pole.

Related eclipses

Solar eclipses 2091–2094

Saros 152

Metonic cycle

Notes

References

 NASA graphics

2094 01 16
2094 in science
2094 01 16
2094 01 16